The 2009–10 season was Dundee's 5th consecutive season in the Scottish First Division following their relegation from the SPL in 2005. Dundee finished as runners-up in the league, losing out to Inverness Caledonian Thistle. The Dee reached the quarter-finals in both the Scottish Cup & Scottish League Cup and were winners of the Challenge Cup for the second time in the club's history and first since 1991.

Match results

Scottish First Division

Scottish Cup

Scottish League Cup

Scottish Challenge Cup

Final

Player statistics

Squad
Last updated 9 December 2011

|}
Players with a zero in every column only appeared as unused substitutes

Disciplinary record

Includes all competitive matches.

Last updated 9 December 2011

Top scorers

Last updated on 10 December 2011

Clean sheets
{| class="wikitable" style="font-size: 95%; text-align: center;"
|-
!width=15|
!width=15|
!width=15|
!width=150|Name
!width=80|League
!width=80|Scottish Cup
!width=80|League Cup
!width=80|Challenge Cup
!width=80|Total
|-
|1
|GK
|
|Tony Bullock
|7
|–
|1
|2 
|10
|-
|2
|GK
|
|Robert Douglas
|4
|0
|0 
|0
|4
|-
|3
|GK
|
|Derek Soutar
|1
|1
|–
|–
|2
|-
|4
|GK
|
|Bobby Geddes
|0
|–
|–
|–
|0
|-
|
|
|
! Totals !! 12 !! 1 !! 1 !! 2 !! 16

Team statistics

Division table

Division summary

Match stats
{|class="wikitable" style="text-align: center;"
|-
!
!Scottish First Division
!Scottish Cup
!League Cup
!Challenge Cup
|-
|align=left| Games played          || 36 || 3 || 4 || 4
|-
|align=left| Games won             || 16 || 2 || 3  || 4
|-
|align=left| Games drawn           || 13 || 0 || 0 || 0
|-
|align=left| Games lost            || 7 || 1 || 1 || 0
|-
|align=left| Goals for             || 48 || 4 || 13 || 11
|-
|align=left| Goals against         || 34 || 3 || 7 || 3
|-
|align=left| Players used          || 28 || 20 || 22 || 22
|-
|align=left| Yellow cards          || 64 || 2 || 2 || 3
|-
|align=left| Red cards             || 4 || 0 || 0 || 0
|-

Results summary

Results by opponent

Last updated on 10 December 2011

Source: 2009–10 Scottish First Division Results Table 
a.  Dundee's score is shown first.

Transfers

Transfers Summer

Players in

Players out

Transfers Winter

Players in

Players out

See also
 List of Dundee F.C. seasons

References

Dundee
Dundee F.C. seasons